Damian Hieronymus Johannes Freiherr von Boeselager (born 8 March 1988) is a German business consultant, journalist and Volt Europa politician who has sat in the European Parliament since being elected in 2019.

Early life and education
Damian Boeselager is descended from the Boeselager family. His grandfather Philipp von Boeselager was a Wehrmacht field officer during Nazism and a member of the 20 July Plot. His father is the banker Georg Freiherr von Boeselager and his mother Huberta, née Thiel. Damian Freiherr von Boeselager is Catholic and the youngest of four children, born in Frankfurt.

Boeselager graduated from high school at the Aloisiuskolleg in Bad Godesberg. From 2008 to 2011, he studied Philosophy and Economics at the University of Bayreuth and Public Administration at the Hertie School of Governance in Berlin from 2016 to 2017. He completed a semester abroad at Columbia University in New York City. In 2017 he graduated with a Master's degree.

Political career
In 2017, Boeselager together with Andrea Venzon from Italy and Colombe Cahen-Salvador from France founded Volt Europa as a "pan-European", "pragmatic" and "progressive" party. Damian Boeselager is Vice President of Volt and together with Marie-Isabelle Heiss was the German lead candidate for Volt in the 2019 European elections. During the European election campaign Boeselager did not pursue any income activity and was financially supported by his family. He is the main interview partner for Volt in press reports as well as radio and television broadcasts due to his party activities. Ranking first in the German list of Volt Europa, which reached 0.7%, he was elected to the European Parliament in 2019.

Member of the European Parliament, 2019–present
In parliament, Boeselager has been serving as member of the Committee on Constitutional Affairs and as substitute of the Committee on Budgets. He has been the parliament's rapporteur on the budget of the European Union for 2022.

He is also a member of:

 Committee on Industry, Research and Energy (as substitute)
 Committee on Civil Liberties, Justice and Home Affairs (as substitute)
 Special Committee on Artificial Intelligence in a Digital Age (as substitute)
 Delegation for relations with the United States (as substitute)
 Delegation for relations with Canada

References

External links
 Damian Boeselager on Volt Europa's website
 Damian Boeselager on Parliamentwatch
 Self-introduction of Damian Boeselager on YouTube
 Official Webpage of Damian Boeselager
 Vote record in the European Parliament of Damian Boeselager

1988 births
Eurofederalism
Politicians from Frankfurt
MEPs for Germany 2019–2024
Living people
Volt Europa politicians
Hertie School alumni